Anolis insignis, the decorated anole, is a species of lizard in the family Dactyloidae. The species is found in Panama and Costa Rica.

References

Anoles
Reptiles of Panama
Reptiles of Costa Rica
Reptiles described in 1871
Taxa named by Edward Drinker Cope